Emergency Mobile Alerts (EMA) is an alerting network in New Zealand designed to disseminate emergency alerts to mobile devices. Emergency Mobile Alerts are messages about emergencies sent by New Zealand authorised emergency agencies to capable mobile phones. The alerts are sent to participating wireless providers who will distribute the alerts to their customers with compatible devices via Cell Broadcast, a technology best suitable for public warning as it simultaneously delivers messages to all phones using a Mobile Cell tower. Similar solutions are implemented in the United States (Wireless Emergency Alerts (WEA)), The Netherlands (NL-Alert), European Union (EU-Alert), Canada, Japan, Taiwan, Chile, Philippines.
One2many B.V. provides this modern Emergency Mobile Alert system including the Cell Broadcast systems and the CAP (Common Alerting Protocol) based centralised Public Warning management system.

Adoption Rate 
Emergency Mobile Alerts has been used in New Zealand since November 2017, and every year a test message is sent which is broadcast throughout New Zealand. The reach of the Control Cell Broadcast message among New Zealanders who have access to a mobile phone has increased since the first test message resulting that on 24 November 2019 8 out of 10 mobile handsets (79%) received a test emergency alert message sent out by Civil Defence and a further eight (8%) percent didn’t personally receive the alert but were near someone who did reaching in the end 87% of the New Zealand population. 

26 November 2017 - 58% of NZ population with access to mobile phone either received the nationwide test alert or was near someone who did receive the Cell Broadcast message
25 November 2018 - 79% of NZ population with access to mobile phone either received the nationwide test alert or was near someone who did receive the Cell Broadcast message
24 November 2019 - 87% of NZ population with access to mobile phone either received the nationwide test alert or was near someone who did receive the Cell Broadcast message

National Public Warning System implementations
Many countries have implemented location-based alert systems based on Cell Broadcast. The alert messages to the population, already broadcast by various media, are relayed over the mobile network using Cell Broadcast.

Japan - J-Alert 
Canada - Alert Ready 
United States - Wireless Emergency Alerts 
European Union - EU-Alert
Netherlands - NL-Alert 
Greece - GR-Alert
Italy - IT-Alert
Lithuania - LT-Alert
Romania - RO-Alert
South Korea - Korean Public Alert Service
Taiwan - Public Warning System
Sri Lanka - Disaster and Emergency Warning Network (DREWN)
Philippines  - Emergency Cell Broadcast System (ECBS)
Chile - LAT-Alert
Peru - SISMATE
United Arab Emirates - UAE-Alert
Saudi Arabia - SAUDI-Alert
Oman - OMAN-Alert

Notable uses

22 October 2019 - New Zealand International Convention Centre fire, Auckland.
25 March 2020 - Announcement of impending move to COVID-19 Alert Level 4, nationwide.
29 and 31 January 2023 - 2023 North Island floods, Auckland.
14 February 2023 - Evacuation notice due to Cyclone Gabrielle, Muriwai

References

External links
 (National Emergency Management Agency (NEMA))
 Emergency Mobile Alert Video Commercial
List of Cell Broadcast capable cell phones with instructions to enable EMA

Emergency services in New Zealand
Emergency population warning systems